Prince Antoine d'Arenberg (1593-1669), also known as Father Charles of Brussels, was definitor-general and Commissary of the Capuchins.

He wrote "Flores Seraphici", containing biographies of eminent Capuchins from 1525 to 1612 and "Clypeus Seraphicus", a defence of Boverius's "Annales Capucinorum".

References

1669 deaths
1593 births
Capuchins
Date of death unknown